ŽKK Kvarner is a Croatian Women's basketball club from Rijeka. The club's greatest success was in the 2014–15 season of the Croatian Women's Basketball League, when they finished as runners-up.

History

2000s

2010s

Names in history
 2006-2014 - Pleter
 2014-currently - Kvarner

Notable former players
Iva Serdar
Katarina Mrčela
Martina Gambiraža

External links
Official website
Profile at eurobasket.com

Women's basketball teams in Croatia
Sport in Rijeka
Basketball teams established in 2006